Ruben W. Wills (born August 9, 1971) is a former member of the New York City Council, serving the 28th district from 2011 until he was convicted of a felony in August 2017. After serving a 2 - 6 year prison sentence, the New York Supreme Court Appellate Division, Second Department, reversed Wills' convictions and ordered a new trial. On April 22, 2021, Ruben Wills was fully exonerated and the charges were dismissed with prejudice. He is a Democrat.

Life and career
Wills is African-American and was born in Southeast Queens. He was raised in the South Jamaica Houses and attended Public School 40 and Thomas Edison High School. He and his wife, Marcia, are members of the St. Albans Congregational Church.

In 2003, Wills served as the special assistant to City Council Member Leroy Comrie, and later he served as chief of staff to State Senator Shirley Huntley. Wills also worked for the SEIU Local 1199 Union. Prior to working in government, Wills made his living operating a contracting company doing renovations for commercial and residential properties.

New York City Council
After losing the 2009 primary to Thomas White, Jr., Wills won the council seat for the 28th district in Southeast Queens the next year, after White died. He then won re-election in 2011 to complete the term, and again for his own full term in 2013. Wills renamed a street in his district in honor of White, thanks to the help of his surviving family.

As a council member, Wills mobilized his community behind several initiatives including removing sex offenders from a new homeless shelter near an elementary school, opposing the establishment of a homeless drop-in center near a high school, organizing a town hall to discuss body cameras on police officers, and stopping a juvenile prison from being constructed in South Ozone Park

In 2013, Wills went homeless to raise awareness of the plight of homeless individuals in his community. He pumped gas for tips and slept in parks, relying on soup kitchens to stay fed. The week long experiment was cut short after Wills reportedly developed pneumonia and was temporarily hospitalized when the experience became hazardous to his health. Wills later cited this experience as his motivation to push Mayor Michael Bloomberg to expand rental subsidies stripped from the city budget in 2011.

In August 2013, Councilman Wills secured 4.4 million from 15.5 billion of NYC's capital budget and spent every dollar toward Education initiatives, making him the largest benefactor of schools in the borough. 

In 2016, Councilman Wills also started a, first of its kind, New York City Council fund (13 million) that purchased distressed mortgages from local communities and renegotiated favorable  loan terms which allowed foreclosed residents to stay in their homes in efforts to prevent homelessness. During this same year, Mayor Bill de Blasio signed important legislation strengthening protections for freelance workers and praised Wills for his sponsorship of a bill strengthening voter protections for pre trial detainees and misdemeanor offenders who were currently incarcerated but still had the right to participate in elections.

Criminal charges

In March 2011, Wills responded to two arrest warrants for incidents that occurred over a decade earlier. The first warrant was issued in 1998 for an incident that occurred in 1996. In November 2011, he pleaded guilty to misdemeanor criminal mischief, admitting to stealing items and damaging property in an incident that he called a business dispute. The conviction resulted in no jail time or probation, but Wills had to pay restitution totaling $3,000 and perform 3 days of community service.

The second warrant was for not appearing on scheduled court date in 2002 for an arrest in Nassau County dating back to 2000. The charge was for operating an unlicensed construction business, also a misdemeanor.

On May 7, 2014, Wills was arrested as part of a corruption investigation. The charges included multiple counts of fraud and grand larceny in connection with more than $30,000 in public funds that went missing from a charity he ran. On February 2, 2015 he was arrested again and charged with five felony counts of failing to disclose financial dealings on five separate disclosure reports filed with the city’s Conflicts of Interest Board between 2012 and 2014.

The resolution of the cases from 2014 and 2015 was delayed because Wills' lawyer was removed from the latter case due to a potential conflict of interest, and because of Wills' ongoing medical problems. After his indictment in May 2014, Wills also missed nearly half of his City Council meetings and hearings.

Wills argued that the vast majority of his charges stemmed from the office of New York State Attorney General Eric Schneiderman, who is an opponent of the Southeast Queens Democratic community and largely endorsed his primary opponent, future-Congresswoman Kathleen Rice, in the 2010 Democratic primary for New York State Attorney General. Wills repeatedly called for a special prosecutor to help develop an impartial prosecution.

On July 20, 2017 a jury found Wills guilty on five of the six counts in his corruption trial. He has appealed his conviction and has not yet been sentenced, but was not on the ballot for re-election to his own seat in the primary.

Exoneration
Following Wills    conviction, he was sentenced to two to six years in prison, fined $5,000, and ordered to make restitution of $32,874.  Wills appealed the conviction and vehemently maintained his innocence. On August 12, 2019, Wills was released on parole. 

On September 16, 2020 the New York Supreme Court Appellate Division, Second Department, reversed the convictions and ordered a new trial, stating: 

“The record does not establish that the defendant was acting in bad faith in seeking to present the testimony of these witnesses at the trial,” the appellate court ruled. “The proposed testimony did not deal with a collateral issue, but, rather, went to the heart of the defendant's claim of right defense. Thus, it was error for the Supreme Court to have prospectively precluded the defendant's witnesses from testifying, and, under the facts of this case, that error cannot be deemed harmless.” 

On April 22, 2021, the prosecution dismissed the charges.

References

External links
Distance Learning 
Cricket
Cricket Plans
Synthetic Marijuana

Living people
People from Jamaica, Queens
New York City Council members
New York (state) Democrats
21st-century American politicians
New York (state) politicians convicted of crimes
African-American New York City Council members
21st-century African-American politicians
1971 births